Melody Perkins (born January 28, 1978) is an American actress, model and dancer. She is known for her regular role as the villainess later turned heroine Astronema/Karone in Power Rangers in Space, and became the Pink Ranger in Power Rangers Lost Galaxy.

Early life and education
Perkins was born in Wiesbaden, West Germany and grew up in Sacramento, California, graduating from Foothill Highschool in 1989. Her major in college was quantitative economics.

Career
An accomplished dancer, Perkins has performed with the Sacramento Ballet Company and the Jazz Unlimited Dance Company. She also models, with clients which include Lands' End. She broke into acting during a modelling trip to Europe, making commercials in Italy and France.  Nevertheless, she has not abandoned modelling entirely, saying, "I still do it when I can."

As an actress, Perkins's longest-running role was in the Power Rangers franchise. She played the lead villainess Astronema in Power Rangers in Space. She said of the role: "It's fun being the bad girl." Perkins returned as the reformed Karone in Power Rangers Lost Galaxy. She replaced Valerie Vernon (who left to battle leukemia) as the Pink Galaxy Ranger. She is the only person to have played the Power Rangers' arch-enemy in one season and a Power Ranger in the next season. Perkins also voiced a monster in Power Rangers Lightspeed Rescue.

Perkins has also appeared as the babysitter Patty Henderson in Malcolm in the Middle, an evil witch in Charmed, and in episodes of various other series.  She has also appeared in a commercial for Allstate Insurance. Perkins retired from acting after she made a brief appearance in an episode of CSI: Miami in 2004.

In 2007, Perkins appeared on a cover for Let's Live magazine.

Perkins has recently returned to acting, reprising her role as Karone in the final episode of Power Rangers Super Megaforce, which aired in November 2014. Along with other past and current Power Rangers cast members, she makes regular appearances at various sci-fi/comic cons.

Filmography

Film

Television

References

External links

1978 births
20th-century American actresses
21st-century American actresses
Actresses from Sacramento, California
American film actresses
American television actresses
German emigrants to the United States
Living people
People from Wiesbaden